Ben Harris was an American Negro league pitcher in the 1920s.

Harris played for three teams during the 1921 season: the Chicago American Giants, Columbus Buckeyes, and Indianapolis ABCs. The following season he played for the Bacharach Giants.

References

External links
 and Seamheads

Year of birth missing
Year of death missing
Place of birth missing
Place of death missing
Bacharach Giants players
Chicago American Giants players
Columbus Buckeyes (Negro leagues) players
Indianapolis ABCs players